Adam Michael Kraus (born September 10, 1984) is a former American football guard.

Collegiate career

At Michigan, Kraus was a four-year letterman who appeared in 39 career games, making 35 starts along the offensive line. Adam started 26 straight games to finish his career, 21 at left guard and the final five contests at center. He is a two-time All-Big Ten first-team selection in 2006 and 2007.

Professional career
Adam was signed by the Baltimore Ravens as a rookie free agent on May 9, 2008 and released on August 30, 2008.

References

1984 births
Brother Martin High School alumni
Jewish American sportspeople
Living people
Players of American football from New Orleans
American football offensive guards
Michigan Wolverines football players
Baltimore Ravens players
21st-century American Jews